The 1898 Indiana State Sycamores football team represented Indiana State University in the 1898 college football season.  This was the third team for the university and played  a schedule of only three games. The head coach was Fred DuBridge and the roster consisted of at least 18 lettermen.

DuBridge, the director of the local YMCA, spend most of his career managing YMCA facilities; his son Lee achieved fame as one of the most preeminent scientists of the 20th century.

Schedule

References

Indiana State
Indiana State Sycamores football seasons
Indiana State Sycamores football